Vern Emerson (born September 2, 1945) is a former American football tackle. He played for the St. Louis Cardinals from 1969 to 1971.

References

1945 births
Living people
American football tackles
Players of American football from Minnesota
St. Louis Cardinals (football) players